Doris Mary Gertrude Fisher, Baroness Fisher of Rednal, JP (13 September 191918 December 2005), née Satchwell, was a British politician.

Early life and career
Born in Birmingham, she was the daughter of Frederick James Satchwell. She was educated at Tinker's Farm Girls' School, Fircroft College and Bournville Day Continuation College.

She joined the Labour Party in 1945 and was nominated director of her local Co-operative board in 1951. A year later, Fisher was elected a member of the Birmingham City Council, in which she sat until 1974. Subsequently, she served as a member of the Warrington and Runcorn Development Corporation until 1989. Fisher was National President of the Co-operative Party Guild in 1961 and was appointed a Justice of the Peace.

Parliamentary career
She contested Birmingham Ladywood in 1969 at a by-election in which Wallace Lawler of the Liberals gained the seat from Labour. In the following general election, Fisher defeated him when she was returned as the constituency MP, representing the seat until the February 1974 general election when her seat was altered in boundary changes. After her departure from the House of Commons, she was created a life peer as Baroness Fisher of Rednal, of Rednal, in the City of Birmingham on 2 July 1974.

In the House of Lords, Fisher became Crown Representative of the General Medical Council in September 1974 and later chaired the Esperanto Group. She was nominated an Assistant Whip for Environment in 1983, an office she held until the following year. Fisher entered the European Parliament in 1975, sitting in Strasbourg until 1979. She was vice-president of the Institute of Trading Standards Administration (today the Trading Standards Institute).

In December 1991, at the age of 72, Lady Fisher slept rough in a nest of cardboard boxes at Birmingham's St Philip's Cathedral to draw attention to the plight of the city's homeless.

Personal life
She married Joseph Fisher, a sheet-metal-worker at the Longbridge plant, in 1939 and had two daughters. Her husband died in 1978 and she survived him until 2005, when she died aged 86.

References

External links
 

1919 births
2005 deaths
Alumni of Fircroft College
Councillors in Birmingham, West Midlands
Life peeresses created by Elizabeth II
Labour Party (UK) MPs for English constituencies
Fisher of Rednal
UK MPs 1970–1974
UK MPs who were granted peerages
Female members of the Parliament of the United Kingdom for English constituencies
20th-century women MEPs for England
MEPs for the United Kingdom 1973–1979
Labour Party (UK) MEPs
20th-century British women politicians
Women councillors in England
Co-operative Women's Guild